Jahnu Barua (born 1952) is an Indian film director. He has written and directed a number of Assamese and Hindi films. Some of his notable films are Halodhia Choraye Baodhan Khai (1987), Firingoti (1992), Xagoroloi Bohu Door (1995), Maine Gandhi Ko Nahi Mara (2005), Konikar Ramdhenu (2003), Baandhon (2012), and Ajeyo (2014).

Jahnu Barua has been conferred Padma Shri (2003) and Padma Bhushan (2015). He served as chairman of the Indian Film Directors' Association in 1993.

Filmography

Television
 Adhikar (Right, 1988)
 Ek Kahani (One Story, 1986)

Politics 

The Raijor Dal officially announced that Jahnu Baruah had extended his support along with Assamese film actress Zerifa Wahid and lawyer Arup Borbora.

Awards
Jahnu Baruah has received the following awards:

 Padma Shri in 2003
 Padma Bhushan in 2015

National Film Awards
 2013:  Best Feature Film in Assamese: Ajeyo
 2012:  Best Feature Film in Assamese: Baandhon
2003: Best Regional Film for Konikar Ramdhenu
2003: National Film Award for Best Children's Film for Tora
1999: Best Regional Film for Pokhi
1998: Best Regional Film for Kuhkhal
1995: Best Director for Hkhagoroloi Bohu Door
1995: Best Regional Film for Hkhagoroloi Bohu Door
1992: Second Best Feature Film for Firingoti
1990: Best film on Environment for Bonani
1987: Best Film for Halodhia Choraye Baodhan Khai
1983: Best Regional Film for Aparoopa

Chicago International Film Festival
2005: Getz World Peace Prize for Hkhagoroloi Bohu Door

Brussels International Independent Film Festival
1996: Best Director for Hkhagoroloi Bohu Door

Fukuoka International Film Festival
2006 Kodak Vision Award for Maine Gandhi Ko Nahin Mara

Fribourg International Film Festival
1996: Audience Award for Hkhagoroloi Bohu Door
1996: Award of the Pestalozzi Children's Village Foundation for Hkhagoroloi Bohu Door

Locarno International Film Festival
1988: Prize of the Ecumenical Jury – Special Mention for Halodhia Choraye Baodhan Khai
1988: Silver Leopard for Halodhia Choraye Baodhan Khai

Singapore International Film Festival
1996: International Fipresci Award for Hkhagoroloi Bohu Door

Mumbai International Film Festival
2005: International Fipresci Award for Maine Gandhi Ko Nahin Mara

Sarhad (NGO)
2012: 1st Bhupen Hazarika National award

References

External links
 
 
 Jahnu Barua at 
 Jahnu Barua at Kinopoisk
rediff.com interview
Gandhism is Serious Business

1952 births
Living people
Film and Television Institute of India alumni
Film directors from Assam
Hindi-language film directors
Assamese-language film directors
People from Sivasagar
Best Director National Film Award winners
Recipients of the Padma Bhushan in arts
Recipients of the Padma Shri in arts
20th-century Indian film directors
Screenwriters from Assam
21st-century Indian film directors
Film producers from Assam
Producers who won the Best Feature Film National Film Award
Directors who won the Best Feature Film National Film Award
Directors who won the Best Children's Film National Film Award
Directors who won the Best Film on Environment Conservation/Preservation National Film Award